Dreamy is a 1960 studio album by American jazz singer Sarah Vaughan.

This was Vaughan's first album for Roulette Records.

Reception

The Allmusic review by Scott Yanow awarded Dreamy three stars and said that "The emphasis is on ballads on this Roulette LP...Harry "Sweets" Edison contributes some soft melodic trumpet but the focus is very much on the singer...This is nice music that deserves to be reissued."

Track listing
 "Dreamy" (Sydney Shaw, Erroll Garner) - 2:56
 "Hands Across the Table" (Mitchell Parish, Jean DeLettre) - 2:52
 "The More I See You" (Mack Gordon, Harry Warren) - 3:06
 "I'll Be Seeing You" (Irving Kahal, Sammy Fain) - 2:52
 "Star Eyes" (Don Raye, Gene de Paul) - 2:58
 "You've Changed" (Carl T. Fischer, Bill Carey) - 3:35
 "Trees" (Oscar Rasbach, Joyce Kilmer) - 3:01
 "Why Was I Born" (Jerome Kern, Oscar Hammerstein II) - 2:29
 "My Ideal" (Leo Robin, Richard A. Whiting, Newell Chase) - 2:56
 "Crazy He Calls Me" (Bob Russell, Carl Sigman) - 3:08
 "Stormy Weather" (Ted Koehler, Harold Arlen) - 3:28
 "Moon Over Miami" (Joe Burke, Edgar Leslie) - 2:29

Personnel 
Sarah Vaughan - vocal
Harry "Sweets" Edison - trumpet
Two unknown flutes
Two unknown woodwinds
Three unknown trombones
Unknown string section
Gerald Sanfino - flute, alto flute, alto saxophone
Barry Galbraith - guitar
Janet Soyer - harp
Ronnell Bright – piano, celeste
Richard Davis - double bass
George Duvivier
Percy Brice - drums

References

1960 albums
Sarah Vaughan albums
Roulette Records albums
Albums produced by Jimmy Jones (pianist)